This page shows the coats of arms, heraldic achievements, and heraldic flags of the House of Nassau.

Also included in the royal family section are the flags of the Dutch royal family. While not strictly a heraldic flag or a banner of arms, they are heavily influenced by heraldry. Flags of those born into the royal family feature a Nassau-blue cross on an orange field, while the colors are reversed for those who marry into the family. The males have near-square flags while those of females are swallowtailed. Elements of an individual's family coat of arms are also incorporated into the flags.

Overview of Nassau arms

Background and origins
The ancestral coat of arms of the Ottonian line of the house of Nassau is shown below.  Their distant cousins of the Walramian line added a red coronet to distinguish them.   There is no documentation on how and why these arms came to be.  As a symbol of nobility, the lion was always a popular in western culture going all the way back to Hercules.  Using the heraldic insignia of a dominant power was a way, and still is a way, to show loyalty to that power.  Not using that insignia is a way to show independence.  The Netherlands, as territories bordering on the Holy Roman Empire with its Roman eagle  and France with its Fleur-de-lis, had many examples of this. The lion was so heavily used in the Netherlands for various provinces and families (see Leo Belgicus) that it became the national arms of the Dutch Republic, its successor states the Netherlands, Belgium, and Luxembourg.  Blue, because of its nearness to purple, which in the northern climes tended to fade (red was the other choice), was also a popular color for those with royal aspirations. The billets could have been anything from blocks of wood to abstractions of the reinforcements holding the shield together.  The fact that these were arms were very similar to those of the counts of Burgundy (Franche-Comté) did not seem to cause too much confusion.  It also held with one of the basic tenets of heraldry, that arms could not be repeated within a kingdom, but Nassau was considered to be in the Kingdom of Germany, while Franche-Comté was in the kingdom of Burgundy (see also Scrope v Grosvenor).

Coats of arms of sovereignty also show the territories that the dynasty claims to rule over.  The principle ones are depicted below, i.e.

The Principality of Orange, which gave them their major title and claim to equal status with all the other sovereign rulers of the world, Prince of Orange.

Then, 
The Lordship of Chalons and Arlay, a large set of lands in the Franche-Comté
The County of Geneva

And in Germany,
County of Katzenelnbogen a large set of lands near the County of Nassau
The County of Dietz, also near the County of Nassau
County of Meurs, bordering on the northeastern Netherlands

Finally, in the Netherlands, the real base of their wealth and power:
County of Vianden, in the southern Netherlands along the river Meuse.
Marquisate of Vlissingen (Flushing) and KampenVeere, which sat along the mouth of the Rhine and the trade routes across the North Sea and the world beyond.
County of Buren, also long the delta of the Rhine, but further inland.

Arms of branches

Counts of Nassau

Walramian line

Comtes de Nassau-Wiesbaden-Idstein

Counts of Nassau-Weilburg

Branches of Nassau-Weilburg

Branche cadette de Nassau-Weilburg

Princes of Nassau-Weilburg 

In 1816, the princes of Nassau-Weilburg had inherited all the other Walramian Nassau territories by the family compact and by the Congress of Vienna became dukes of Nassau.

Dukes of Nassau

House of Nassau-Weilburg, Grand Dukes of Luxembourg

House of Nassau-Weilburg, princes of Bourbon-Parma

Ottonian Line

Counts of Nassau-Dillenburg 

Henry III of Nassau-Breda came to the Netherlands in 1499 as heir to his uncle, Engelbrecht II of Nassau-Breda.  His and his uncle's arms are shown below.  When Philbert, prince of Orange died in 1530, his sister's son René of Breda inherited the Princedom of Orange on condition that he used the name and coat of arms of the Châlon-Orange family. History knows him therefore as René of Châlon instead of as "René of Nassau-Breda." The 1st and 4th grand quarters show the arms of the Chalons-Arlay (the gold bend) princes of Orange (the bugle). The blue and gold cross is the arms of Jeanne of Geneva, who married one of the Chalons princes. The 2nd and 3rd show the quarterings of Brittany and Luxembourg-St. Pol.  The inescutcheon overall is his paternal arms quartered of Nassau and Breda. William the Silent's father, William the Rich, was rich only in children.  He bore the arms shown below.  Clockwise from upper left they displayed the arms of Nassau (1st quarter), Katzenelenbogen (3rd quarter), Dietz (2nd quarter), Vianden (4th quarter).

The Great Princes of Orange, House of Orange-Nassau 

As the kingdom of Burgundy fragmented in the early Middle Ages, the Holy Roman Emperor Frederick I Barbarossa elevated the lordship of Orange to a principality in 1163 to shore up his supporters in Burgundy against the Pope and the King of France. As the Empire's boundaries retreated from those of the principality, the prince acceded to the sovereign rights that the Emperor formerly exercised. As William the Silent wrote in his marriage proposal to the uncle of his second wife, the Elector August of Saxony, he held Orange as "my own free property", not as a fief of any suzerain; neither the Pope, nor the Kings of Spain or France.

On becoming prince of Orange, William placed the Châlon-Arlay arms in the center ("as an inescutcheon") of his father's arms.  He used these arms until 1582 when he purchased the marquisate of Veere and Vlissingen.  It had been the property of Philip II since 1567, but had fallen into arrears to the province. In 1580 the Court of Holland ordered it sold. William bought it as it gave him two more votes in the States of Zeeland. He owned the government of the two towns, and so could appoint their magistrates. He already had one as First Noble for Philip William, who had inherited Maartensdijk. This made William the predominant member of the States of Zeeland. It was a smaller version of the countship of Zeeland (& Holland) promised to William, and was a potent political base for his descendants. William then added the shield of Veere and Buren to his arms as shown in the arms of Frederick Henry, William II and William III with the arms of the marquisate in the top center, and the arms of the county of Buren in the bottom center. William also started the tradition of keeping the number of billets in the upper left quarter for Nassau at 17 to symbolize the original 17 provinces of the Burgundian/Habsburg Netherlands, which he always hoped would form one united nation.

As sovereign Princes, the princes of Orange used an independent prince's crown or the  princely hat. Sometimes, only the coronet part was used (see, here and here). After the establishment of the Kingdom of the Netherlands, and as the principality of Orange had been incorporated into France by Louis XIV, they used the Dutch Royal Crowns.  The full coats of arms of the princes of Orange, later Kings of the Netherlands, incorporated the arms above, the crown, 2 lions as supporters and the motto "Je maintiendrai" ("I will maintain"), the latter taken from the Chalons princes of Orange, who used "Je maintiendrai Chalons".

Illegitimate Lines of Orange-Nassau

King of England, Scotland, and Ireland

Princes of Nassau-Dillenbourg and princes of Nassau-Siegen 
In 1739 the House of Orange-Nassau inherited the possessions of the Nassau-Dillenbourg line.

Counts of Nassau-Siegen, protestant branch

Nassau-Dietz 

In 1606 the Nassau-Dillenburg branch partitioned also into Nassau-Dietz and Nassau-Siegen.

Princes of Orange-Nassau(-Dietz) 

In 1702, the line of Nassau-Dietz inherited the principality of Orange according to the will of William III, and became the line of Orange-Nassau-Dietz.  However, France disputed this and occupied the principality.

When John William Friso became Prince of Orange, he used the arms below.  However, he was never recognized outside of Holland and areas friendly to Holland as Prince of Orange.  His son, William IV, recognized as Prince of Orange, seems to have used the original arms of William the Silent. When the princes of Orange fled the Netherlands during the Batavian Republic and the Kingdom of Holland, and when France occupied the Netherlands, they were compensated by Napoleon with the Principality of Nassau-Orange-Fulda. These principalities were confiscated when Napoleon invaded Germany (1806) and William VI supported his Prussian relatives. He succeeded his father as Prince of Orange later that year, after William V's death.  The house of Orange-Nassau also had several illegitimate lines (see below) who based their arms on the arms of Nassau-Dillenburg.

In 1814, the Congress of Vienna reached a concord that awarded the whole county of Nassau, raised to a duchy, to the Walramian branch (Nassau-Weilburg).  In compensation, the Ottonian Branch (princes of Orange), and then raised to King of the Netherlands, were awarded the Grand Duchy of Luxemburg as their personal dominion.  So, when Belgium became independent, Luxemburg remained with the house of Orange-Nassau in personal union with the Dutch monarch.  In 1890, with the death of William III of the Netherlands, Luxemburg was inherited by the Walramian branch as part of this compact.

Counts and Princes of Nassau-Schaumburg

Kings of the Netherlands (House of Orange-Nassau) 

When William VI of Orange returned to the Netherlands in 1813 and was proclaimed Sovereign Prince of the Netherlands, he quartered the former Arms of the Dutch Republic (1st and 4th quarter) with the "Châlon-Orange" arms (2nd and 3rd quarter), which had come to symbolize Orange (see above). As an in escutcheon he placed his ancestral arms of Nassau. When he became King in 1815, he combined the Dutch Republic Lion with the billets of the Nassau arms and added a royal crown to form the Coat of arms of the Netherlands. In 1907, Queen Wilhelmina replaced the royal crown on the lion and the shield bearers of the arms with a coronet.

Wilhelmina further decreed that in perpetuity her descendants should be styled "princes and princesses of Orange-Nassau" and that the name of the house would be "Orange-Nassau" (in Dutch "Oranje-Nassau").  Only those members of the members of the Dutch Royal Family that are designated to the smaller "Royal House" can use the title of prince or princess of the Netherlands (according to the Membership to the Royal House Act which was revised in 2002.) Since then, individual members of the House of Orange-Nassau are also given their own arms by the reigning monarch, similar to the United Kingdom. This is usually the royal arms, quartered with the arms of the principality of Orange, and an in escutcheon of their paternal arms.

The Royal House of the Netherlands tends to use Heraldic flags more extensively than their arms.  So these are also shown here.

House of Orange-Nassau, princess of Mecklenburg-Schwerin

House of Orange-Nassau, princess of Lippe-Biesterfeld

House of Orange-Nassau, Jonkheere van Amsberg (van Orange-Nassau van Amsberg)

Notes and references

External Links and sources 
 Johannes Rietstap: 
 Johannes Rietstap: 
 Johannes Rietstap: 
 Johannes Rietstap: 
  
 John Pinches: 
 Herbert H. Rowen, The princes of Orange: the stadholders in the Dutch Republic. Cambridge and New York: Cambridge University Press, 1988.
 Herbert H. Rowen, The princes of Orange: the stadholders in the Dutch Republic. Cambridge and New York: Cambridge University Press, 2003.
 Pieter Geyl, "Orange and Stuart, 1641–1672". Scribner, 1970.
 
 
Browse this armorial on the website of the KB nationale bibliotheek:
 Background information about this armorial in Dutch on the website of the KB.  
 This armorial was presumably commissioned by Engelbrecht II of Nassau (1451–1504). After him it was possibly owned by William I, Prince of Orange (William the Silent) (1533–1584) and Jacques Wijts (ca. 1579–1643). In 1898 the manuscripts is known to be in the library of the German graphical artist Otto Hupp ("O.H. 1898" in the bottom right corner of the binding).
 The original limp parchment binding is from circa 1500. Inside it shows the coat of arms of William of Orange and an annotation from the 17th century stating Ick hoir toe den capitain Vits.
 À propos… des armoiries de S.A.R. le Grand-Duc de Luxembourg sur le site gouvernemental luxembourgeois,
 Nassau sur heraldique-europeenne.org, 
 
 
 ,

Nassau